"Lights Down Low" is a song written and recorded by American recording artist and reality television personality Jessie James Decker. It was first released on August 14, 2015 through the independent label imprint Big Yellow Dog Music. The song, co-written by Alyssa Bonagura, was inspired by Decker's relationship with husband Eric Decker, with whom she stars on the E! network reality series, Eric & Jessie: Game On.

"Lights Down Low" debuted at number 38 on the Billboard Hot Country Songs chart, giving Decker her largest country music hit to date. In 2016, Decker signed a record deal with Epic Records and re-released the single through that label on June 17, 2016. The song serves as the lead single for Decker's third extended play, Gold (2017). A music video directed by PR Brown premiered in July 2016 starring Decker and her husband.

Critical reception
Matt Bjorke of country music blog Roughstock praised the song for showcasing who Decker is as an artist and noted the vocals and production were both "strong."

Commercial performance
"Lights Down Low" reached number one on the iTunes Country sales chart shortly after release, notably out-selling The Band Perry's major label-supported single "Live Forever" during its first three days. The song debuted on the Billboard Country Digital Songs chart at number 15 with 18,000 units sold during the chart week (but 21,000 sales total, due to being released three days before the chart week began) for the week of August 24, 2015. As of October 12, 2015, "Lights Down Low" has sold over 35,000 units. It debuted and peaked at number 38 on the Billboard Hot Country Songs chart dated September 5, 2015.

Track listing

Music video
The accompanying music video was directed by PR Brown and filmed in southern California. It premiered July 12, 2016. The video stars Decker and her real-life husband, American football player Eric Decker, and gives a "glimpse of her home life" with scenes depicting a quiet date night at home.

Live performances
Decker appeared on The Today Show on August 31, 2016 to perform the song live.

Charts

Release history

References 

2015 songs
2015 singles
Jessie James Decker songs
Epic Records singles
Songs written by Alyssa Bonagura